Atlas Studios is a film studio located  west of the city of Ouarzazate in Morocco. Measured by acreage, it is the world's largest film studio. Most of the property lies in the nearby desert and mountains.
Many sets from the filming of various movies remain in place and, because of this, the studio also operates with guided tours and has become a popular tourist destination.

The company was founded in 1983 by entrepreneur Mohamed Belghmi. Since then it has been able to expand, thanks to reliable climate and weather conditions, and because the area is of a nature that can mimic the natural environments of many countries well.

Productions
Films and TV series that have used the services of the studio include:

 The Jewel of the Nile
 The Living Daylights
 Aladdin (2019 film)
 The Mummy
 Gladiator 
 Kingdom of Heaven
 Asterix & Obelix: Mission Cleopatra
 Babel
 Game of Thrones
 Atlantis
 The Amazing Race 10
 The Amazing Race Australia 6
 The Grand Tour
Vikings
Prison Break
The old guard

References

External links
 Official website (archived)
 imdb location list

Film studios
Cinema of Morocco
Entertainment companies established in 1983